Berlei House, now known as Curtin House, is an Inter-war Art Deco-style building located at 39-47 Regent Street, in the City of Sydney local government area of New South Wales, Australia. The concrete building with six floors was built for Berlei United Limited in the early 1920s and occupied by Berlei in 1922.

It is considered an architecturally significant building, and is a key part of a proposed heritage area in and around South Regent Street.

The building has been renovated and is now being used by Curtin University.

References

Industrial buildings completed in the 20th century
Buildings and structures in Sydney
Art Deco architecture in Sydney
Chippendale, New South Wales